Yoma sabina, the Australian lurcher, is a butterfly of the family Nymphalidae. It is found in the northern Australasian realm and in Southeast Asia.

The wingspan is around 7 cm.

The larvae feed on Dipteracanthus bracteatus and Ruellia species (wild petunias).

References

External links
Australian caterpillars

Junoniini
Taxa named by Pieter Cramer
Butterflies described in 1780